Eila Vilhelmina Hiltunen (22 November 1922, Sortavala – 10 October 2003, Helsinki) was a Finnish sculptor. She is most famous for the Sibelius Monument (1967). A statue by Hiltunen resembling a smaller version of the Sibelius Monument stands on the grounds of the United Nations headquarters in New York City.

Life
Hiltunen was born into a prosperous family in 1922. Her father invested in automobiles and her mother was a strong supporter of her only child. The family's prospects changed dramatically during the economic crash of 1929 and her father took to drink. He died in 1941 and it was her mother who brought her up. Hiltunen's artistic ambitions were empowered at the Finnish Art Academy where she won the prize for sculpture twice.

She married in 1944 and had children. She and her sometimes violent husband had a difficult relationship. She always used her birth name. Their marriage lasted 50 years until Otso Pietinen's death although they were not always together.

Hiltunen is most famous for the Sibelius Monument which was constructed in 1967. The sculpture won a competition organised by the Sibelius Society following the composer's death in 1957. It is one of the most popular tourist sights in Helsinki.

Although her abstract sculpture of pipes is now well regarded as an important Finnish landmark, its initial reception was controversial. The objection centred on the abstract design; and although the design looked like stylised organ pipes, it was known that the composer had created little music for organs. To address her critics' concern, she was required to add Sibelius's face beside the main sculpture. A sculpture by Hiltunen resembling a smaller Sibelius Monument stands in the grounds of the United Nations headquarters in New York City.

Hiltunen was awarded the Finland Prize in 2000. Her husband, Otso Pietinen, died in 1993, and Hiltunen died in 2003.

In 2022, a major retrospective of Hiltunen's works was held at the Didrichsen Art Museum in Helsinki to mark the 100th anniversary of her birth.

References

External links

 Eilahiltunen.net
 Catalogue for retrospective exhibition in 2001

1922 births
2003 deaths
People from Sortavala
20th-century Finnish sculptors
20th-century Finnish women artists
Finnish women sculptors